Beaumont Park is a neighborhood in southwestern Lexington, Kentucky, United States. Its boundaries are Parkers Mill Road to the west, Lane Allen Road to the north, Lansill Dr to the east, and New Circle Road to the south.

Neighborhood statistics

 Area: 
 Population: 594
 Population density: 3,068 people per square mile
 Median household income (2010): $72,229

Education

 Elementary: James Lane Allen 
 Middle: Beaumont 
 High: Dunbar

References

Neighborhoods in Lexington, Kentucky